Betty Rollin (born January 3, 1936, in New York City) has been an NBC News correspondent and author.

Rollin's reports have won both the DuPont and Emmy awards.  She now contributes reports for PBS's Religion and Ethics News Weekly.

Rollin is a graduate of Fieldston Ethical Culture School and Sarah Lawrence College, where she was a classmate of Yoko Ono, as Ono mentioned on the Dick Cavett Show.

Rollin was first diagnosed with breast cancer in 1975, and again in 1984, each time losing a breast to the disease. Rollin discussed her cancer publicly and wrote about it in the book, First, You Cry. to encourage public awareness and to give encouragement to others facing this disease. First, You Cry was made into a television movie starring Mary Tyler Moore as Rollin.

Rollin's mother Ida was diagnosed with terminal ovarian cancer in 1981, and Rollin helped her mother end her life in 1983. She revealed this in her book Last Wish, published in 1985 and republished in 1998.  One critic called it "a document of personal compassion and public importance." The book has been published in 19 countries and was made into a TV movie in 1992 starring Patty Duke as Rollin and Maureen Stapleton as her mother.

Since the book was published, Rollin has been active in the Death with Dignity movement. She is now on the advisory board of Compassion and Choices.

She lived with her husband, mathematician Dr. Harold Edwards, in Manhattan until his death in 2020. They had no children.

Books 
 First, You Cry (1976) 
 Last Wish (1985) 
 Am I Getting Paid for This?: A Romance About Work  (1986) 
 Here's the Bright Side: Of Failure, Fear, Cancer, Divorce, and Other Bum Raps (2007)

References

See also
Betty Rollin website
Death with Dignity National Center

1936 births
Living people
Jewish American journalists
American women journalists
American non-fiction writers
Television personalities from New York City
American women television personalities
Euthanasia in the United States
Journalists from New York City
21st-century American Jews
21st-century American women